Koshy is an Indian Saint Thomas Christian name and may refer to:

Elizabeth Koshy, Indian sport shooter
J B Koshy (born 1947), Indian judge
Koshy Koshy, Indian Anglican priest and Malayalam novelist
Liza Koshy (born 1996), American actress and YouTube personality
Mridula Koshy (born 1969), Indian writer
Ninan Koshy (1934–2015),  Indian political thinker